Wesley College was a private liberal arts college in Dover, Delaware. It was acquired by Delaware State University in 2021 and is now the DSU Downtown campus.

History
The institution was founded in 1873 as Wilmington Conference Academy, a prep school. During this period Annie Jump Cannon, a prominent astronomer who pioneered stellar classification, graduated valedictorian from Wilmington Conference Academy in 1880.  It became a two-year college in 1918 and renamed the Wesley Collegiate Institute. It was renamed again in 1941 as Wesley Junior College, and again in 1958 as Wesley College. The institution conferred its first four-year degrees in 1978.

In its last decades, the college experienced significant financial challenges and relied on state funding and grants. At one point in 2019, had the state not given Wesley $3 million, students would have lost access to federal financial aid and salaries would have been at risk. In early 2021, members of the college faculty voted "no confidence" against Wesley's last president, Robert E. Clark II, but the college's board of trustees subsequently dismissed the resolution and supported him.

On June 30, 2021, Delaware State University (DSU) began the formal process of purchasing Wesley College. This made DSU "the first historically Black college or university to acquire another college." The acquisition was finalized one year later, on July 1, 2021. Approximately 60 percent of the Wesley community were offered employment by Delaware State University. DSU took on Wesley College's debts and did not directly pay to purchase the university. All Wesley students with non-adverse records were permitted to become DSU students. After the acquisition, the campus was known as DSU Downtown, while the Wesley name remained attached to the Wesley College of Health and Behavioral Sciences housed at the campus.

Academics
Prior to ceasing operations, many of its students pursued a liberal arts program of study.  At its close, Wesley College had 917 students.

Athletics

The institution competed in National Collegiate Athletic Association's Division III athletics in the Atlantic East Conference. Its teams were known as the Wolverines.

Notable alumni

 William N. Andrews (1898) lawyer and Republican Party politician, including serving as U.S. Representative for Maryland's 1st congressional district (1919–1921)
 Colin R.J. Bonini (1991) Republican Party politician, including serving as a member of the Delaware Senate from the 16th district (since 1995)
 Joe Callahan (B.S. 2016) quarterback for the Philadelphia Eagles of the National Football League (NFL)
 Annie Jump Cannon (1880) Astronomer
 Wayne Gilchrest (A.A., 1971) Republican Party politician, including serving as U.S. Representative for Maryland's 1st congressional district (1991–2009)
 Matt Gono (2017) professional football player for the Atlanta Falcons of the National Football League (NFL)
 Charles M. Oberly, III (A.A., 1966) lawyer and Democratic Party politician, including serving as Delaware Attorney General (1983–1995); U.S. Attorney for the District of Delaware (since 2010)
 Bryan Robinson professional football player; awarded all-American football player
 Carolyn Bunny Welsh Republican Party politician, disgraced former sheriff of Chester County, Pennsylvania

See also
 List of colleges and universities in Delaware

References

External links

DSU & Wesley - Delaware State University

 
1873 establishments in Delaware
Buildings and structures in Dover, Delaware
Education in Kent County, Delaware
Educational institutions established in 1873
Educational institutions disestablished in 2021
Preparatory schools in Delaware
Two-year colleges in the United States
Universities and colleges affiliated with the United Methodist Church
Defunct private universities and colleges in Delaware
Liberal arts colleges in Delaware